The Whitehead Women's Pairs bridge championship is held at the spring American Contract Bridge League (ACBL) North American Bridge Championship (NABC).

The Whitehead Women's Pairs is a four-session matchpoint (MP) pairs event with two qualifying and two final sessions. The event typically starts on the second Thursday of the NABC and is restricted to female players.

History

The Whitehead Women’s Pairs is an event for partnerships consisting of two female players. There are two qualifying sessions, followed by two final sessions. The contest was held annually at the Summer North American Bridge Championship until 1962. That was changed the following year and subsequently contested at the Spring North American Bridge Championship.

At stake is the Whitehead Trophy, donated in 1930 by Wilbur Whitehead of New York, a great bridge authority and a member of the team that won the Vanderbilt Cup in 1928, the first year it was in play. Whitehead (1866–1931) was president of the Simplex Automobile Company, but bridge held such a fascination for him that he retired from business in 1910 to devote his life to bridge. He was the inventor of many bidding and play conventions, the quick-trick table of card values, the Whitehead system of requirements for original bids and responses and the Whitehead table of preferential leads. Whitehead was instrumental in standardizing procedures in auction bridge and later in contract bridge.

Winners

No Women's Pairs champion has defended its title in more than 50 years, but four early winners did so on seven occasions: 1939, 1942–43, 1948, 1956–58. The four-time winners from 1955 to 1958 were Kay Rhodes and Margaret Wagar.

See also
 Smith Life Master Women's Pairs

Sources

 List of previous winners, Page 8. 

 2009 winners, Page 1. 
 2017 winners, Page 1. 

 "Search Results: Whitehead Womens Pairs". 1930 to present. ACBL. Visit "NABC Winners". Retrieved 2016-12-18.

North American Bridge Championships